Leitebakk or Leitebakken is a small village on the island of Godøya in Giske Municipality in Møre og Romsdal county, Norway. Leitebakk is located at the end of the undersea Godøy Tunnel that connects the island to the neighboring island of Giske. Godøy Chapel is located just south of the village of Leitebakk.

References

Villages in Møre og Romsdal
Giske